This article lists events that occurred during 1949 in Estonia.

Incumbents

Events
 25 March – an extensive deportation campaign was conducted in Estonia, Latvia and Lithuania. The Soviet authorities deported more than 92,000 people from the Baltics to remote areas of the Soviet Union.

Births
3 March – Jüri Allik, Estonian psychologist
3 April – Ivo Eensalu, actor and stage director 
12 June – Ivo Linna, Estonian singer

Deaths

References

 
1940s in Estonia
Estonia
Estonia
Years of the 20th century in Estonia